Kai Gehring (born 12 February 1988) is a German footballer who plays for an amateur side TSG Salach.

References

External links

1988 births
Living people
1. FC Nürnberg II players
SV Wehen Wiesbaden players
1. FC Saarbrücken players
SG Sonnenhof Großaspach players
3. Liga players
German footballers
Association football defenders
People from Göppingen
Sportspeople from Stuttgart (region)
Footballers from Baden-Württemberg